The 1887 Brooklyn Grays finished the season in sixth place.

Offseason 
 December 1886: Jack O'Brien was purchased by the Grays from the Philadelphia Athletics.

Regular season

Season standings

Record vs. opponents

Roster

Player stats

Batting

Starters by position 
Note: Pos = Position; G = Games played; AB = At bats; R = Runs; H = Hits; Avg. = Batting average; HR = Home runs; RBI = Runs batted in; SB = Stolen bases

Other batters 
Note: G = Games played; AB = At bats; R = Runs; H = Hits; Avg. = Batting average; HR = Home runs; RBI = Runs batted in; SB = Stolen bases

Pitching

Starting pitchers 
Note: G = Games pitched; GS = Games started; IP = Innings pitched; W = Wins; L = Losses; ERA = Earned run average; BB = Walks; SO = Strikeouts; CG = Complete games

Notes

References 
Baseball-Reference season page
Baseball Almanac season page

External links 
Acme Dodgers page 
Retrosheet

Los Angeles Dodgers seasons
Brooklyn Grays season
Brooklyn
19th century in Brooklyn
Park Slope